"Full Moon" is the second single from Armand Van Helden's fourth studio album Killing Puritans (2000).

Formats and track listings
CD single
 "Full Moon" (clean radio edit) – 3:39
 "Full Moon" – 4:22
 "Koochy" (edit) – 3:22
 "Koochy" (video) – 3:41

12" single
 "Full Moon"
 "Full Moon" (dub)

Personnel
 Armand Van Helden – producer, mixing
 Common – vocals

Production
 Neil Petricone – executive producer
 Nilesh Patel – mastering

Chart performance

References

External links
 

2000 singles
Armand Van Helden songs
Common (rapper) songs
Songs written by Armand Van Helden
2000 songs
Songs written by Common (rapper)